Amata ceres is a moth of the  subfamily Arctiinae. It was described by Charles Oberthür in 1878. It is found in Malawi and Tanzania.

References

 Natural History Museum Lepidoptera generic names catalog

ceres
Moths described in 1878
Moths of Africa